The Mr. Nepal competition is a male beauty pageant organized by Expose Nepal. It was founded in 2002. The entrants compete in various activities including swimming, Extreme challenge and physique, Talent performances, mountain climbing, and marathon running. The current Mr. Nepal is Nutan Shrestha of Morang District who was crowned on April 17, 2022 in Kathmandu, Nepal. Traditionally, Mr Nepal lives in Kathmandu during his reign.

The winner of Mr. Nepal is sent to Mister World since 2016, before the winner usually competed at Mr. International contest.

Titleholders

Represent by Provinces

The list of Mister Nepal to represent to 
The list of Mister Nepal to represent to Mister World, mister Supranational, Mister Global, Mister International & Manhunt International.

Mister World
List of Nepal representatives at Mister World

 Runner-Up
 Semi-finalists / Finalist

Represent by Provinces

Mister Supranational
List of Nepal representatives at Mister Supranational

 Runner-Up
 Finalist

Represent by Provinces

Mister Global
List of Nepal representatives at Mister Global

 Runner-Up
 Semi-finalists / Finalist

Represent by Provinces

Manhunt International
List of Nepal representatives at Manhunt International

 Runner-Up
 Semi-finalists / Finalist

Represent by Provinces 

2016 Samim Khan Kathmandu TBA

Mister International
List of Nepal representatives at Mister International

References
 

Nepal